The Adelaide Football Club is an AFL club based in Adelaide, South Australia. It has been in the AFL since 1991, and (as of 2021) has had 11 different coaches. 

Two of these, Mark Bickley and Scott Camporeale, were interim coaches. Bickley coached the remainder of 2011 after the resignation of Neil Craig, and Camporeale coached the remainder of 2015 after the death of Phil Walsh. Craig was also an interim coach, after Gary Ayres resigned in 2004, but then secured the full-time role the next year.

Coaches
 Note: As of Round 1, 2022.

Notes

References

Adelaide Football Club coaches
Australian rules football records and statistics
Football Club coaches